Laudenbach is a town in the district of Rhein-Neckar in Baden-Württemberg in Germany.

References

Rhein-Neckar-Kreis